Christiane Köpke ( Knetsch, born 24 August 1956 in Brandenburg an der Havel) is a German rower who competed for East Germany. She won the Olympic gold medal at the 1976 Summer Olympics as well as four years later at the 1980 Summer Olympics. She was a member of SG Dynamo Potsdam / Sportvereinigung (SV) Dynamo.

References

External links
 
 
 

1956 births
Living people
East German female rowers
Olympic rowers of East Germany
Rowers at the 1976 Summer Olympics
Rowers at the 1980 Summer Olympics
Olympic gold medalists for East Germany
Olympic medalists in rowing
World Rowing Championships medalists for East Germany
Medalists at the 1980 Summer Olympics
Medalists at the 1976 Summer Olympics
Sportspeople from Brandenburg an der Havel